Keith Walker (June 29, 1935 — December 30, 1996) was an American writer, producer, and actor. He co-wrote the screenplay for the film Free Willy, and wrote for television series including The Fall Guy, Emergency!, Quincy, M.E. and M*A*S*H." He wrote 26 episodes of the Rod Serling hosted radio show The Zero Hour, all of them coming in the second, and final, season of the show. He appeared as an actor on television shows Mannix, The Rookies, Mission: Impossible, and Fantasy Island. Walker had a memorable role as Mr. Walsh in the film The Goonies. He was married to actress Peggy Walton-Walker.

Following brief treatment for cancer, Keith Walker died in Franklin, Tennessee at the age of 61 in late 1996. The third Free Willy film, Free Willy 3: The Rescue, was dedicated to his memory.

Filmography

Film

Acting credits

Screenwriting credits

Television

Acting credits

Screenwriting credits

References

External links

1935 births
1996 deaths
American male screenwriters
American television writers
American male television actors
20th-century American male actors
American male television writers
20th-century American male writers
20th-century American screenwriters